Ferdinand Joseph Sébastien de Brahm (1752–1822) was a surveyor and a military engineer.

De Brahm was born Germany in 1752. He began work as a military Engineer under the Prince-Elector of Trier before coming to America to assist his uncle, William Gerard de Brahm, the Surveyor General of Georgia, South Carolina, and East Florida, in charting a series of nautical maps. Then, upon the outbreak of the Revolutionary War, de Brahm joined the Corps of Engineers, attaining the rank of Captain and then Major. He charted maps of campaigns in New York and Pennsylvania (1777–1779); during the Siege of Charleston he kept a detailed journal of the onslaught (1780).

He was elected as a member to the American Philosophical Society in 1784.

References

Members of the American Philosophical Society
1752 births
1822 deaths
Continental Army officers from Germany
German military engineers
German surveyors
18th-century cartographers
19th-century cartographers